Morven Christie (born 1 September 1981) is a Scottish actress. She is best known for her roles as Alison Hughes in the BBC drama The A Word, Amanda Hopkins in the ITV drama Grantchester, and DS Lisa Armstrong in ITV crime series The Bay.

Early life and education
Born and raised in Glasgow. Christie left school at 15, eventually studying acting at the Drama Centre London, under Reuven Adiv, an associate of Lee Strasberg.

Career
In 2006, Christie played Juliet and Hero for the Royal Shakespeare Company in their Complete Works season.

In 2008, Christie was cast in Sam Mendes's first Bridge Project theatre company, playing Anya in Tom Stoppard's new adaptation of The Cherry Orchard, and Perdita in Shakespeare's The Winter's Tale which finished at The Old Vic in London, after a sellout run at Brooklyn Academy of Music in New York City and a world tour. She played Isa in the National Theatre’s production of Glasgow classic Men Should Weep, directed by Josie Rourke. 

Among her many television roles, she played Ellen Rooney in the 2017 BBC drama The Replacement. This role gained Christie her first BAFTA Scotland nomination. 

She also played Amanda Hopkins in the ITV drama Grantchester for its first three seasons, Alison Hughes in the critically acclaimed BBC drama The A Word, for which she was again nominated for a BAFTA Scotland Award, playing the mother of an autistic child. In 2018 she also played Kirsten Lindstrom in Sarah Phelps' production of Agatha Christie's Ordeal by Innocence.

Christie starred as DS Lisa Armstrong, the lead role in the ITV crime drama series The Bay, filmed through the latter months of 2018, and aired on ITV from 20 March 2019. She received her third consecutive BAFTA Scotland nomination for her performance. It was announced on 16 February 2021 that Christie had quit the drama, which had just completed a second series.

She has since completed two independent films and Joe Cornish's 8-part drama Lockwood & Co. for Netflix.

Personal life

Christie lives in Glasgow with her partner, musician Iain Cook.

Filmography

Film

Television

Stage

Audio

Radio
When You Cure Me (2006, radio play) as Rachel
An Inspector Calls  as Sheila Birling
Whenever I Get Blown Up I Think of You as Molly Naylor
A Farewell to Arms (2011, BBC Radio 4) as Catherine Barkley
 Austerlitz  (December 2012, BBC Radio 3) as Agata

Audiobooks

Code Name Verity (2012)
Burial Rites (2013)

References

External links
 
 

1981 births
Alumni of the Drama Centre London
Living people
Actresses from Glasgow
People from Helensburgh
Royal Shakespeare Company members
Scottish film actresses
Scottish stage actresses
Scottish television actresses
Scottish Shakespearean actresses
21st-century Scottish actresses
Scottish radio actresses
Audiobook narrators